Patmos is an unincorporated community in Baker County, in the U.S. state of Georgia.

History
The community was named after the Greek island of Patmos, a place mentioned in the Bible.

References

Unincorporated communities in Baker County, Georgia
Unincorporated communities in Georgia (U.S. state)